List of notable French dictionaries

Monolingual dictionaries

French–English bilingual dictionaries

See also
List of Arabic dictionaries
List of Chinese dictionaries
List of English dictionaries
List of Dutch dictionaries
List of German dictionaries
List of Japanese dictionaries